Hovenden is an English surname. Following English immigration there in the sixteenth century it also became more common in Ireland. Notable people with this surname include the following:

 Giles Hovenden, an Anglo-Irish figure who established the Hovenden family in Ireland
 Helen Corson Hovenden (1846–1935), American painter 
 Robert Hovenden (died 1614), English academic administrator at the University of Oxford
 Robert Hovenden (Ireland), a seventeenth century Irish landowner who took part in the Irish Rebellion of 1641
 Roger Hovenden (fl.1174–1201), English chronicler
 Thomas Hovenden (1840–1895), Irish-American artist and teacher

Hovenden, like all English surnames, can also be used as a given name:

 Hovenden Hely (1823–1872), Australian explorer and politician
 Sir Hovenden Walker (1656/66–1725/28), British naval officer

English-language surnames